Neil John McCallum (20 May 192926 April 1976) was a British-Canadian actor.

After attending the Guildhall School of Music and Drama in London, McCallum's first major appearance on stage was alongside Sam Wanamaker in The Rainmaker in the mid-1950s. He appeared in British TV series in the 1950s, 1960s and early 1970s, including The Saint, Department S and UFO, and in films such as The Siege of Pinchgut (1959) and Dr. Terror's House of Horrors (1965). He provided the voices of Dr Ray Pierce in the film Thunderbirds Are Go (1966) and an airport controller in the TV series Captain Scarlet and the Mysterons (1967).  He played lead character Angelo James in the BBC TV series Vendetta (1966–68).

He dated the British film and stage actress Julie Andrews early in her career, as mentioned in Andrews' autobiography Home.

He was also a scriptwriter (scripting two 1964 thrillers, Do You Know this Voice? and Walk a Tightrope, among other things), producer and occasional director.

McCallum lived at George's Farm, Crookham Common, near Thatcham, until his sudden death on 26 April 1976.

Filmography

References

External links

1929 births
1976 deaths
20th-century British male actors
20th-century Canadian male actors
Canadian expatriates in England
Male actors from Ontario
Alumni of the Guildhall School of Music and Drama
British male film actors
British male stage actors
British male television actors
British male voice actors
Canadian emigrants to England
Canadian male film actors
Canadian male stage actors
Canadian male television actors
Canadian male voice actors
Neurological disease deaths in England